This article is a list of episodes produced for the My-Otome anime series, the second season of the My-HiME anime series. The series has twenty six main episodes, nine omake episodes, and a four-part OVA series. The television series aired on TV Tokyo from October 6, 2005 to March 30, 2006. Although billed as the second season of My-HiME, it takes place in a new setting with different main characters. Most My-HiME characters make reappeances in different roles. The episodes were later released on nine DVDs. Like My-HiME, My-Otome also has omake included with each DVD release that provide supplementary information about the show. Unlike the My-HiME omake, the My-Otome omake are fully animated, with some material taken from the TV episodes and some new animated content. There are nine omake episodes, one on each DVD. My-Otome Zwei is a four-part OVA series set a year after the series. A prequel to My-Otome entitled My-Otome 0: S.ifr is also released. The first episode was released on February 22, 2008.

TV Episodes

DVD Omake 

The tenth special "Otome no Inori" was released 26 March 2010. It is a picture drama included in the new Blu-ray release.

My-Otome Zwei

My-Otome 0: S.ifr

References
 General
 Otome After Hours: Garderobe Official Web - Sunrise's official episode listing.

 Specific

My-Otome